Bojana Gregorić-Vejzović (born 17 February 1972) is a Croatian film, theatre and television actress. She starred in Naša mala klinika as Dr. Lili Štriga, also appeared in the biographical drama Lea and Darija and voiced Helen Parr in the Croatian-language dub of The Incredibles franchise.

Personal life
Bojana Gregorić-Vejzović was born in Zagreb in 1972. Her father, Boris Gregorić, was a film producer, while her mother, Božidarka Frajt, an ethnic Serb, is a prominent actress.

In 2006 she married Croatian actor, Enes Vejzović, with whom she has two children; a son, Raul, and a daughter, Zoe.

References

External links
 

Living people
1972 births
Croatian actresses
Croatian people of Serbian descent
Croatian film actresses
Croatian television actresses
Croatian stage actresses
Croatian voice actresses
Actresses from Zagreb